Rienzi is a town in Alcorn County, Mississippi, United States. The population was 317 at the 2010 census.

History
Rienzi was named for Cola di Rienzo, a medieval Italian politician. The original town was settled in 1830 and was located one mile west of its current location, near the Nesly Williams Plantation.

Geography
The town is concentrated along Mississippi Highway 356 (signed as Main Street and Front Street), just east of the highway's intersection with U.S. Route 45, in southern Alcorn County. Corinth lies to the north, Booneville lies to the south, and Glen lies to the northeast.

Demographics

As of the census of 2000, there were 330 people, 127 households, and 99 families residing in the town. The population density was 332.9 people per square mile (128.7/km). There were 147 housing units at an average density of 148.3 per square mile (57.3/km). The racial makeup of the town was 69.39% White, 28.48% African American, 2.12% from other races. Hispanic or Latino of any race were 3.64% of the population.

There were 127 households, out of which 26.0% had children under the age of 18 living with them, 56.7% were married couples living together, 16.5% had a female householder with no husband present, and 22.0% were non-families. 21.3% of all households were made up of individuals, and 14.2% had someone living alone who was 65 years of age or older. The average household size was 2.60 and the average family size was 3.04.

In the town, the population was spread out, with 25.2% under the age of 18, 10.3% from 18 to 24, 24.8% from 25 to 44, 26.7% from 45 to 64, and 13.0% who were 65 years of age or older. The median age was 39 years. For every 100 females, there were 94.1 males. For every 100 females age 18 and over, there were 77.7 males.

The median income for a household in the town was $26,563, and the median income for a family was $31,375. Males had a median income of $31,125 versus $20,625 for females. The per capita income for the town was $10,604. About 22.6% of families and 28.4% of the population were below the poverty line, including 36.7% of those under age 18 and 34.8% of those age 65 or over.

Education
The town of Rienzi is served by the Alcorn School District.

Notable people
 Jamie Davis, Southern rock singer
 Lee Denson, rockabilly singer and songwriter
 Billy McCoy, politician
 Bill Michael, head football coach of the University of Texas at El Paso from 1977 to 1981.

References

Towns in Alcorn County, Mississippi
Towns in Mississippi
Populated places established in 1830
1830 establishments in Mississippi